Amy Elizabeth Price-Francis (born 16 September 1975) is a British-Canadian actress.  She starred as Detective Jessica King on the Showcase drama, King.

Life and career

Price-Francis was born in England and raised in Toronto, Ontario, Canada.  She is a graduate of the National Theatre School of Canada.

Amy is known for starring in several Canadian series, including Tracker and Rumours.  She also starred in the A&E show, The Cleaner.  Furthermore, she has guest starred in several shows.  One of her well-known guest-starring roles is that of minor antagonist Cara Bowden on the TV series 24.

Filmography

Awards

References

External links
 

1975 births
Living people
Canadian television actresses